The 1991 San Diego State Aztecs football team represented San Diego State University during the 1991 NCAA Division I-A football season as a member of the Western Athletic Conference (WAC).

The team was led by head coach Al Luginbill, in his third year. They played home games at Jack Murphy Stadium in San Diego, California. They completed the season with a record of eight wins, four losses and one tie (8–4–1, 6–1–1 WAC). The year finished with an appearance in the Freedom Bowl in Anaheim, California vs. the Tulsa Golden Hurricane.

Schedule

Team players in the NFL
The following were selected in the 1992 NFL Draft.

Team awards

Notes

References

San Diego State
San Diego State Aztecs football seasons
San Diego State Aztecs football